IN-9, IN 9, or IN9 may refer to:

 Indiana's 9th congressional district
 Indiana State Road 9